Hannah Shaw may refer to:

 Hannah Shaw (basketball) (born 1990), British basketball player
 Hannah Shaw (internet celebrity) also known as the Kitten Lady, animal rights advocate